Ángel Cabrera (born 1969) is an Argentine golfer.

Ángel Cabrera may also refer to:

Ángel Cabrera (naturalist) (1879–1960), Spanish zoologist
Ángel Cabrera (footballer) (1939–2010), Uruguayan football forward
Ángel Cabrera (academic) (born 1967), President of Georgia Tech
Ángel Lulio Cabrera (1908–1999), Spanish-Argentine botanist

See also
Ángel Cabrera Classic, a golf tournament on the TPG Tour, the official professional golf tour in Argentina
Cabrera (disambiguation)